Love is on the Air is a 1937 American film directed by Nick Grinde, and starring Ronald Reagan (in his film debut), June Travis, Eddie Acuff, Robert Barrat, Raymond Hatton and Willard Parker. It was the first of three remakes of the 1933 Paul Muni picture Hi, Nellie. (The later ones were You Can't Escape Forever (1942), with George Brent, and House Across the Street (1949), with Wayne Morris.)  It was ironic that, in his first movie, Reagan starred as a radio announcer, as he had just moved from Des Moines Iowa where for almost 5 years after graduating college, as a sports radio announcer he broadcast games for the Chicago Cubs, Big Ten football games and title fights from a play-by-play telegraph wire.

Plot summary

Reckless radio commentator Andy McCaine (Ronald Reagan) gets into trouble when he attacks a corrupt city government, and his boss forces him to host an innocuous kiddie program.

Cast
 Ronald Reagan as Andy McCaine
 June Travis as Jo Hopkins
 Eddie Acuff as 'Dunk' Glover
 Ben Welden as 'Nicey' Ferguson
 Robert Barrat as J.D. Harrington
 Addison Richards as E.E. Nichols
 Raymond Hatton as Weston
 Tommy Bupp as Mouse
 Dickie Jones as Bill - Mouse's Friend
 Willard Parker as Les Quimby
 William Hopper as Eddie Gould
 Spec O'Donnell as Pinky
 Herbert Rawlinson as Mr. George Copelin
 Lynne Roberts (credited as Mary Hart) as Mrs. George Copelin
 Jack Mower as Police Captain Lang

See also
 Ronald Reagan filmography

References

External links 
 
 
 
 

1937 films
1937 crime films
1930s English-language films
Films directed by Nick Grinde
American black-and-white films
American crime films
1930s American films